The Matabeleland Zambezi Water Project (MZWP) is an ambitious project being undertaken in the arid Matabeleland North province of Zimbabwe.The project seeks to end the perennial water shortages bedevilling Zimbabwe's second city of Bulawayo by bringing water from the mighty Zambezi river to the city.

The Project 
The project can be classified as a Major Project. It is expected to cost US$600 million which is a huge investment by African standards. The project will consist of three phases as follows:
Phase One: Gwayi-Shangani Dam  
Phase Two: Gwayi-Shangani Dam to Bulawayo Pipeline
Phase Three: Gwayi-Shangani Dam to Zambezi River Pipelne

Phase One: Gwayi-Shangani Dam 
The Gwayi-Shangani dam is the first phase of the MZWP and is the core of the project. Commenced in September 2004 it is expected to provide a reservoir for this project. The dam will be located about 6 km downstream of the confluence of the Gwayi River and Shangani River.

Dam Type and Description
Type: It is a Roller Compacted Concrete gravity dam, which means it is a dam relying on its weight for stability. 
Dimensions
Length:  305 metres from one mountain to the other.
Width: 60 metres at the base.
Height: 70 metres maximum.
Bridge: Dam will have a bridge at the top of width 8 m.
Depth and Capacity
Maximum water depth: 59 metres, 11 metres freeboard.
Capacity: 634 million m³
10% Yield: 210 million m³
Materials Used And Quantities
Concrete: 300,000 m³
Quarry: 400,000 m³
Cement/Water Ratio: 0.55
Fly ash/Cement Ratio: 7:3
Concrete Grades: Dental 20, other 25.

Phase Two: Gwayi-Shangani Dam to Bulawayo Pipeline 
The envisaged pipeline will be 260km. Construction of the pipeline is scheduled to be completed in 2022. In April 2021, the Government of Zimbabwe floated a tender for the construction of the pipeline.

References

Further reading
 "Government floats Shangani Pipeline Tender"The Sunday Mail
 "Mugabe to sign US$600m Zambezi Water Project deal" NewZimbabwe.com
 "Chefs in fresh land grab orgy in Mat North" Financial Gazette
 "Water conservation - Bulawayo" Sokwanele
 "Water and the Potential for Resource Conflicts in Southern Africa"

Dams in Zimbabwe
Proposed infrastructure in Zimbabwe
Proposed water supply infrastructure